Alexander Henning Hanssen  (born 20 February 1987) is a Norwegian skeleton racer.

He competed at the IBSF World Championships 2017, where he placed 32nd in men's skeleton.

He has been selected to participate in the 2018 Winter Olympics.

References

External links
 
 
 

1987 births
Living people
Norwegian male skeleton racers
Skeleton racers at the 2018 Winter Olympics
Olympic skeleton racers of Norway
Sportspeople from Stavanger